Kollam district, (formerly Quilon district) is one of 14 districts of the state of Kerala, India. The district has a cross-section of Kerala's natural attributes; it is endowed with a long coastline, a major Laccadive Sea seaport and an inland lake (Ashtamudi Lake). The district has many water bodies. Kallada River is one among them, and the east side land of river is East Kallada and the west side land is West Kallada.

Overview 
Kallada Boat race is one of the famous festival events of the district. Even though it is a competition between two land sides of the river, many boat clubs from various places, even beyond the district participate in the event. Kollam is known as the capital of Kerala's cashew industry. Plains, mountains, lakes, lagoons, and backwaters, forests, farmland and rivers make up the topography of the district. The area had trading relationships with Phoenicia and Ancient Rome.

Climate

Kollam's temperature is almost steady throughout the year. The average temperature ranges from 25 to 32 degrees Celsius. Summer usually runs from March until May; the monsoon begins by June and ends by September.

It receives both southwest and northeast monsoons. Winter is from November to February; the temperature is moderately cool, ranging from 18 to 25 degrees Celsius.

Demographics

According to the 2011 census Kollam district has a population of 2,635,375, roughly equal to the nation of Kuwait or the US state of Nevada. This gives it a ranking of 155th in India (out of a total of 640 districts). Its population growth rate over the decade 2001-2011 was 1.72 percent. Kollam has a sex ratio of 1113 females for every 1000 males. The total literacy rate of Kollam district was 94.09%. The male literacy rate was 96.09% and the female literacy rate was 92.31% in Kollam district. Scheduled Castes and Scheduled Tribes make up 12.46% and 0.41% of the population respectively. 

Malayalam is the predominant language, spoken by 99.10% of the population. Small minorities of Tamil speakers live in urban areas.

Urban structure 
The Kollam Urban Agglomeration (UA) is the 6th most populous UA in the state. Kollam is placed 49th in the list of most populous urban agglomerations in India. The metropolitan area of Kollam includes Adichanalloor, Adinad, Ayanivelikulangara, Chavara, Elampalloor, Eravipuram (part), Karunagappally, Kollam, Valakom, Kundara, Kulasekharapuram, Mayyanad, Meenad, Nedumpana, Neendakara, Oachira, Panayam, Panmana, Paravur, Perinad, Poothakkulam, Thazhuthala, Thodiyoor, Thrikkadavoor, Thrikkaruva, Thrikkovilvattom, and Vadakkumthala.

Religion

Hinduism (64.42%) is practised by majority of the people in Kollam district of which Nair (32%) and Ezhava (30.5%) are the largest sub groups. Islam(19.3%) is the second largest religion. Kollam is the only district in Southern Kerala where Muslims outnumber Christians. Despite this Kollam has a significant Christian population too (16%) among this the Latin Catholics (36.7%) and Malankara Orthodox Syrian Church Christians (34.24%) form the majority. The Marthoma Church from 19.06% of the Christians in the district.

Major cities & towns

*In 2015, the area of Kollam City Corporation increased by merging Thrikkadavoor panchayath.

Administration

The history of the district's administration can be traced back to 1835, when the Travancore state consisted of two revenue divisions with headquarters at Kollam and Kottayam. When Travancore and Cochin were combined into Travancore-Cochin, Kollam was one of the three revenue divisions. When the state of Kerala was formed in 1957, half portion of Chenkotta taluk was merged with the state of Madras. Later in 1957, the Cherthala, Ambalapuzha, Mavelikara, Karthikapalli, Chengannur and Thiruvalla taluks (formerly in Kollam district) were united to form the new district of Alappuzha. In 1983, Pathanamthitta taluk and Adoor taluk and seven villages of Kunnathur taluk were removed from Kollam district to form the new Pathanamthitta district.

Assembly representatives

Police administration
Police administration in Kollam is divided into two districts: urban and rural. The City Police is headed by a City Police Commissioner, an IPS (Indian Police Service) officer with the rank of SP; its headquarters is at Kollam. The rural police is headed by the Rural Superintendent of Police (SP), with its headquarters at Kottarakkara. Both heads report to the Inspector General of Police (IGP), Thiruvananthapuram Range (Kerala).

The Kollam City Police is divided into three subdivisions, each under an Assistant Commissioner of Police (ACP): Karunagappally, Kollam and Chathannoor. Each subdivision is divided into circles, headed by the Circle Inspector of Police. Each circle is divided into a number of police stations, headed by a Sub-Inspector of Police. The Kollam Rural Police District is divided into two subdivisions, each under an Assistant Superintendent of Police (ASP)/ Deputy Superintendent of Police (DySP): Kottarakkara and Punalur. There are a total of 29 police stations, in 13 circles. Kollam city traffic is controlled by the City Traffic Police, with a Traffic Police Station located near the Asramam Ground.
Kerala's first coastal police station was established in Neendakara, Kollam.

The first police museum in India-The Sardar Vallabhbhai Patel Police Museum has a large collection of police artefacts and rare photographs. The museum has a room dedicated to officers martyred in the line of duty. The forensic section has a large collection of photographs. The museum is located at the Kollam East Police Station.

Revenue Divisions{RDO}

Administratively Kollam District is composed of two Revenue Divisions, viz Kollam and Punalur with three Taluks each under them.

Taluks

Kollam is administratively divided into 6 taluks. They are Kollam, Karunagappally, Kunnathur, Kottarakkara, Punalur and Pathanapuram, which are subdivided into 104 villages. The tahsildar is the revenue official in charge of each taluk.

Municipalities

There are four municipalities in Kollam District. Punalur, Paravur, Karunagappally and Kottarakkara are the municipalities. There is a long-standing demand for upgrading Pathanapuram & Anchal panchayaths into municipal status.

Lok Sabha constituencies

Kollam district has three Lok Sabha (lower house) constituencies. They include the Chavara, Kundara, Eravipuram, Kollam, Chathannoor, Chadayamangalam and Punalur assembly constituencies. While the Kunnathur, Kottarakkara and Pathanapuram constituencies are in the Mavelikara Lok Sabha constituency, the Karunagapally assembly constituency is in the Alappuzha Lok Sabha constituency.

Transportation

Road
Kollam is connected by bus and train service. It is also connected to neighbouring states by bus service operated by the Kerala State Road Transport Corporation (KSRTC) and Indian Railways. These are the KSRTC Depots & Sub Depots & Operating Centres (OC) in the district:

The district is connected to other parts of Kerala and India through the National Highways – NH 66 (earlier NH 47), NH 183 (earlier NH 220), NH 744 (earlier NH 208). The state highway - Main Central Road (MC Road) and Punalur-Pathanamthitta-Muvattupuzha Main Eastern Highway — connects Kollam with other districts. Intrastate road transportation is served by the KSRTC, Tamil Nadu State Transport and Karnataka State Transport Companies. KSRTC Interstate bus service operates from the Kollam and Kottarakkara KSRTC bus stations. Kollam zone of KSRTC is now the second most revenue generating zone in Kerala.

Rail

Kollam Junction railway station (QLN) is the one and only rail head in the district. A total of 128 short & long-distance services (including weekly) and 10 services of MEMU are running through Kollam Junction railway station. A most modern MEMU maintenance shed is working in the railway station premises of Kollam city. In addition to that, there are some other major railway stations in the district namely Punalur (PUU), Karunagappalli (KPY), Paravur (PVU), Sasthamkotta (STKT), Kottarakara (KKZ) and Kundara (KUV).
Kollam district boasts the record of having most numbers of railway stations in the state.

Trains from here connect the city of Kollam to major cities of India, including New Delhi, Bangalore, Chennai, Indore, Bhopal, Hyderabad, Thiruvananthapuram, Mumbai, Madurai, Vizag, Jammu, Howrah, Guwahati, Madgaon, Itarsi, Hubli, Ahmedabad, Kanyakumari, Gwalior, Nagpur, Pune, Kota, Bhubaneswar, Gorakhpur, Kochi, Kozhikode, Amritsar, Vijayawada, Coimbatore, Chandigarh and Mangalore. There are also passenger services running in Kollam–Thiruvananthapuram, Kollam–Ernakulam and Kollam–Punalur routes.

Water

The district is having a fairly good network of waterways. The State Water Transport Department operates boat services to West Kallada, Munroe Island and Alappuzha. Double decker luxury boats run between Kollam and Allepey daily. Luxury boats, operated by Government and private owners, operate from the main boat jetty during the tourist season. The west coast canal system, which starts from Thiruvananthapuram in the south and ends at Kanhangad in the north, passes through Paravur, the city of Kollam and Karunagappally taluk. The Thiruvananthapuram-Shornur canal, which forms a part of the Thiruvananthapuram-Hosdurg system, runs a distance of about 62 km. The other canal systems include the Paravur Kayal, Kollam Canal and Chavara canal. The waterways are popular attractions and scenic tourist destinations in the area. The Kerala State Water Transport Department (KSWTD) has an operating centre near the KSRTC bus stand. Tourists may hire motorised country boats and houseboats with amenities (Kettavulam in Malayalam) to cruise along the waterways.

Cashew industry

The cashew industry is centralised in this district. Kollam is approved by the central government as a "centre of cashew industry". Most workers in this industry are women; among them, a majority comes from the poorer sections of the society. There are several cashew-processing units in the district. The Kerala State Cashew Development Corporation Ltd., a Government of Kerala undertaking, has its headquarters in Kollam and serves as a model agency for the cashew-processing industry. The corporation has 30 cashew factories and employs more than 20,000 workers. Another government organisation in this field is CAPEX, which is part of the cooperative sector and has 10 cashew factories. Coir production, handloom industry, clay and wood-based industries contribute to the industrial health of the region.

Forests and wildlife
According to the Government of Kerala estimates  of land is under forest cover, mainly in the eastern portion of the district (including the Thenmala, Punalur, and a portion of the Achencoil forest divisions). The Thenmala Range, Aryankavu Range, and Shendurney Wildlife Sanctuary comprise the Thenmala division and the Achencoil, Kallar, and Kanayar Ranges make up the Achencoil division.  The Pathanapuram and Anchal Ranges constitute the Punalur division.

The Shendurney Wildlife Sanctuary,  from Kollam, is situated on the southern part of the Western Ghats (8°50' and 8°55'N; 77°5'and 77°15'E) in the Punalur taluk of the district. The name "Shenduruny" is derived from the name of a tree species locally called "Shenkuruny" or "Chenkuruny" (Gluta travancorica), a tree mainly found in this area. An artificial lake of about  has developed following the construction of a dam across the Kallada River. Remnants of Stone Age culture from a large cave situated at the northwestern part of the Shenduruny River were excavated from this sanctuary. These remains belong to the Mesolithic period.

This tropical rain forest has a wide variety of wildlife, and some endangered species are found here. Species found in the sanctuary include tiger, bonnet and lion-tailed macaques, Nilgiri langur, gaur (or Indian bison), sambar deer, muntjac (or barking deer), Indian spotted chevrotain (or mouse deer), wild boar, Indian elephant and different species of squirrels, such as the Indian giant and Indian palm squirrels.

Fishing
The western portion of Kollam is bordered by the Laccadive Sea. Neendakara and Sakthikulangara are important fishing villages. There are an estimated 26 villages whose livelihood depends entirely on fishing. Cheriazheekkal, Alappad, Pandarathuruthu, Puthenthura, Neendakara, Thangasseri, Eravipuram and Paravoor are among the prominent fishing villages.
One-third of Kerala's fish production (including 60 percent of its prawn catch) is contributed by Kollam, whose average fish production is estimated at 5,275 tonnes. Nearly 3,000 mechanised boats operate out of its fishing harbour.

Tourism

Jadayu earth centre, Palaruvi Falls, Thenmala (forests and reservoir), the Agasthyamalai Biosphere Reserve, Ashtamudi (backwater) and beaches at Kollam, Thirumullavaram and Thangassery are scenic areas.

Ashramam Tourist Village is a well-known tourist destination in Kollam city; the tourist village is located on the banks of Ashtamudi Lake. Ashramam is a hub of tourism activities in Kollam, and the District Tourism Promotion Council (DTPC) office is located within the village.

The Asramam Maidan (Ashramam ground), adjacent to the tourist village, is the largest open space within a Kerala municipal corporation. It is used for events, sports, as a helipad, for Kollam Pooram and by driving schools.

The first community tourism program in the state is being established on the Munroethuruth islands. Backwater tourism is an activity enjoyed in Kollam; Ashtamudi Lake, Paravur, Munroe Island, and Alumkadavu are the main backwater destinations. Accommodation is in resorts and on houseboats.

Kollam was the seat of the Desinganad kings. Kottarakara is well known as the place where a new version of the classical dance form of Kathakali was conceived. It was also the capital of the Elayidath Swaroopam. Kundara is known for the 1812 proclamation against the British by Velu Thampi Dalawa.

Alappad village, located on the seashore, was impacted by the 2004 Indian Ocean earthquake and tsunami.
The Duriyodana Temple is in Kunnathur Taluk. The Sakthikulangara Dharma Sastha Temple-Sree Ayyappa Swamy Temple is known for its Utsavam in the month of Makaram (between mid-January and mid-February).

Polachira, in Chirakkara Gramapanchayat, is a sightseeing destination. The Anathavalam is near here where one can see domestic elephants, touch and ride them.
Jetayu Para, a large boulder, is located in Chadayamangalam; it is named for a mythical character in the Ramayana. It is believed that Jatayu fell here, after his failed attempt to stop Ravana.

See also

Kollam
Kollam Junction Railway Station
Kollam MEMU Shed
Kollam Port
Kureeppally
Asramam Maidan
Malumel
Fatima Mata National College
Punalur
Punalur Railway Station
Punalur Suspension Bridge
Karunagappalli railway station
Paravur
Paravur Railway Station
Educational Institutions in Kollam District
Kollam Beach
Paravur Kayal
Thazhathu Kulakkada
Valacode
Nadakkal
President's Trophy Boat Race
Kollam pooram
List of Sree Narayana Institutions
List of Hindu temples in Kerala
Roman Catholic Diocese of Quilon
University of Kerala
Protected areas of Kerala

References

Further reading

External links

Official website
Official tourism website

 
Districts of Kerala